Amy Schneider (born May 29, 1979) is an American writer and game show contestant. Winning 40 consecutive games on the quiz show Jeopardy! from November 2021 to January 2022 and the November 2022 Tournament of Champions, she holds the second-longest win streak in the program's history, behind only Ken Jennings (74 games), who hosted the show as she competed. She is the most successful woman and most successful transgender contestant ever to compete on the show, in terms of both the length of her streak and her $1.6 million in winnings.

Schneider is known for her skill in the Final Jeopardy! round, having responded correctly 30 out of 41 times in her run. She lives in Oakland, California. Across all American game shows, she is the ninth highest-earning contestant of all time.

Early and personal life 
Schneider grew up in Dayton, Ohio, and attended Chaminade-Julienne High School. In eighth grade, she was voted "Most likely to appear on Jeopardy!" by her classmates.

Throughout her run on Jeopardy!, she expressed admiration for past champions Ken Jennings, James Holzhauer, Matt Amodio, and Julia Collins (the first woman to win 20 games in a row, at the time Jeopardy!'''s second longest streak). On a January 2022 episode of Watch What Happens Live with Andy Cohen, Schneider said that she hoped Jennings would become the permanent host of the program, citing his comforting and empathetic presence.

Schneider has a cat named Meep, a name given to her at the shelter before adoption, "because the only noise she would make was 'meep'. Me and my girlfriend said we would find another name for her, but she kept making that noise, and we realized it was the right name."

Schneider is a trans woman; she completed gender transition in 2017. On January 19, 2022, Schneider was awarded a GLAAD Special Recognition honor for her Jeopardy! performance.

Schneider married her partner Genevieve Davis on May 9, 2022, after a three-month engagement.

 Jeopardy! streak 
Schneider's first victory occurred on the November 17, 2021 episode, dethroning five-day champion Andrew He. In the following 14 games, she only missed one Final Jeopardy! question. She missed a second in her 16th win. In total, Schneider has won over $1 million on Jeopardy!, the fifth-most winnings of any contestant on the show in all play. Schneider is the first openly transgender contestant to qualify for the Tournament of Champions. Her winning streak came one year after Kate Freeman became the first openly transgender contestant to win on the show. Schneider, who viewed Freeman's victory and several other trans contestants' losing appearances on the show as inspiration, has described the significance of having a trans identity: "The fact is, I don't actually think about being trans all that often, and so when appearing on national television, I wanted to represent that part of my identity accurately: as important, but also relatively minor." After surpassing Matt Amodio's 38-game winning streak in the January 24, 2022, episode, Schneider took second place for the most consecutive wins in Jeopardy! history at 39, only behind Jennings's 74 consecutive wins.

 End of streak 
Schneider was defeated in her 41st episode, aired on January 26, 2022, finishing second behind Rhone Talsma, a librarian from Chicago, Illinois. The "Final Jeopardy!" clue was, "The only nation in the world whose name in English ends in an H, it's also one of the 10 most populous." Talsma responded, "What is Bangladesh?", which was correct, putting him ahead of Schneider who had no response. Her winnings totaled over $1,300,000, ranking her fourth in most money won in regular-season play behind Jennings, Holzhauer, and Amodio.

 Tournament of Champions 
Schneider appeared in the Jeopardy! Tournament of Champions that aired in November 2022. On November 21, she won the tournament, along with its $250,000 grand prize. She was the first openly transgender person to compete in, and to win, the Jeopardy! Tournament of Champions.

 Jeopardy! Masters 
In January 2023, ABC announced a new primetime Jeopardy! spinoff, Jeopardy! Masters'', which brings back Schneider along with Amodio, Buttrey, He, Holzhauer, and Roach in a Champions League-style event. It is expected to air within the year.

Strategy 
Schneider has explained that when she sees a category where she is weak, she gets it "out of the way first. That way, if there were any doubles in that category, they would come up when there wasn't as much money to be wagered." Later, she described her wagering strategy in a runaway game with little competition: "round up the second place score to the nearest thousand, double it, subtract it from my score, and then subtract another thousand in case I'd messed something up. Schneider said that doing crossword puzzles helps her think of words "as both a concept and a collection of letters at the same time".

Regular play winnings

See also 
 List of notable Jeopardy! contestants
 Strategies and skills of Jeopardy! champions

References 

Jeopardy! contestants
LGBT people from Ohio
Living people
People from Dayton, Ohio
People from Oakland, California
Transgender women
University of Dayton alumni
1979 births
LGBT people from California